The 2020–21 SEC women's basketball season began with practices in November 2020 and was followed by the start of the 2020–21 NCAA Division I women's basketball season in December. Conference play started in late December and will conclude in February, followed by the 2021 SEC women's basketball tournament at the Bon Secours Wellness Arena in Greenville, South Carolina, in March.

Pre-season

Pre-season team predictions

Pre-season All-SEC teams

Coaches select eight players
Player in bold is choice for SEC Player of the Year

Head coaches

Note: Stats shown are before the beginning of the season. Overall and SEC records are from time at current school.

Weekly rankings

Conference matrix

Postseason

SEC tournament

 March 3–7 at the Bon Secours Wellness Arena in Greenville, South Carolina. Teams are seeded by conference record, with ties broken by record between the tied teams followed by record against the regular-season champion. Vanderbilt canceled its season after three conference games and, therefore, will not participate in the tournament.

NCAA Division I Women's Basketball tournament

 March 21–April 4

Women's National Invitation tournament

 March 19–28

Consolation games

References

 
Southeastern Conference women's basketball seasons